Poa arctica, the Arctic bluegrass or Arctic meadow grass, is a species of flowering plant in the family Poaceae, with a subarctic circumpolar distribution, extending into the Rockies. Often a dominant species in the tundra, it responds positively to disturbance.

References

arctica
Flora of Norway
Flora of Svalbard
Flora of Sweden
Flora of Finland
Flora of North European Russia
Flora of East European Russia
Flora of Siberia
Flora of the Russian Far East
Flora of Subarctic America
Flora of Western Canada
Flora of Eastern Canada
Flora of the Northwestern United States
Flora of Nevada
Flora of Utah
Flora of New Mexico
Plants described in 1823
Flora without expected TNC conservation status